John Senan Cole  is an architect from Northern Ireland. Previously working with the Northern Ireland Civil Service, as of 2021 he was an "independent consultant [..for..] public-sector infrastructure projects".

Professional activities
From 1996 to 1998, he served as president of the Royal Society of Ulster Architects (RSUA).

He was Chief Executive of Health Estates Agency (2003-2008) and latter Deputy Secretary and Chief Estates Officer DHSSPS (2008-2013).

In 2013, he retired from the role of Deputy Secretary and Chief Estates Officer (DHSSPS). Also in 2013, he was commissioned to revise the DCAL Policy for Architecture and the Built Environment.

In 2016, he was commissioned to review the closure of several schools in the Edinburgh Council area. The resulting report, titled "Report of the Independent Inquiry into the Construction of Edinburgh Schools", also known as the "Cole Report", was published in February 2017.

Rrferences

Year of birth missing (living people)
Living people
Architects from Northern Ireland
Commanders of the Order of the British Empire